Stigmella confinalis is a moth of the family Nepticulidae. It was described by Scoble in 1978. It is found in Zimbabwe.

The larvae feed on Dombeya species. They probably mine the leaves of their host plant.

References

Nepticulidae
Moths of Africa
Moths described in 1978